Bardoc may refer to:

 Bardoc, a small town in Western Australia
 Bardóc, the Hungarian name for Brăduț Commune, Covasna County, Romania